The 12417 / 12418 Prayagraj Express is a daily overnight VVIP train which runs between the cities of Prayagraj (earlier known as Allahabad) and New Delhi, India.

Prayagraj Express along with Shram Shakti Express, Shiv Ganga Express and Lucknow Mail enjoys highest priority all over the route.

Rakes
This train used ICF coach till December 2016. On 18 December 2016, replacing the old ICF coach, this train got new German LHB rakes with a total of 24 coaches. Modern LHB coach with a MPS (Maximum Permissible Speed) of 160 km/h are more comfortable. The new coaches, based on a German technology Linke Hoffman Busch (LHB), are made of stainless steel which do not turn turtle during accidents. The light-weight coaches will also improve the train's speed. Bigger windows, biotoilets, lamps at all AC seats and sound insulation are the other features.

Schedule 

12417 PRAYAGRAJ EXPRESS departs Allahabad Junction every day at 10.10 PM IST and arrives New Delhi at 07.00 AM IST

12418 PRAYAGRAJ EXPRESS departs New Delhi at 10.10 PM IST and arrives Allahabad Junction at 07.00 AM IST

Coaches
This train runs with two AC first-class coach, five AC 2 tier coaches, three AC 3 tier coaches, ten sleeper coaches, two general coaches along with two EOG coaches. Thus, having a total of 24 LHB coach. It is the only train in India to be running with 24 LHB coach.

Route & Halts

Traction
It is hauled by a Kanpur-based WAP-7 locomotive on its entire journey.

Accident
In dense fog, on 2 January 2010, the Gorakhdham Express and Prayagraj Express collided near the Panki railway station near Kanpur, about 60 miles (100 kilometers) southwest of Lucknow. Ten people died and about 54 were injured.

See also
 New Delhi railway station
 Allahabad Junction (now officially Prayagraj Junction)
 Allahabad New Delhi Humsafar Express
 Purushottam Express
 Shiv Ganga Express

References

1. "10 killed as trains collide in dense fog U.P.". The Hindu. 2 January 2010. Retrieved 30 September 2020.

External links
Prayagraj Express at India Rail Info

Transport in Delhi
Named passenger trains of India
Trains from Allahabad
Express trains in India
Rail transport in Delhi
Railway services introduced in 1986